Thanmathra is a 2005 Indian Malayalam-language drama film written and directed by Blessy, based on Padmarajan's short story "Orma". It portrays the effects of Alzheimer's disease on the life of Ramesan Nair (Mohanlal) and his family. The film collected three times its budget at the box-office and completed 150 days run. Thanmathra won five Kerala State Film Awards, which includes the Best Film, Best Actor, Best Director, Best Screenplay, and a Special Mention Award for the debutant actor Arjun Lal. It also won the Best Feature Film in Malayalam Award at the 53rd National Film Awards.

Plot
Ramesan Nair (Mohanlal) is a Kerala government secretariat official, cocooned in his own small and happy world. An honest and sincere man, Ramesan's family consists of his loving wife Lekha (Meera Vasudevan), son Manu (Arjun Lal) who is a plus-two student, and daughter Manju (Baby Niranjana), a primary school student. His biggest ambition is to see that his son gets into the IAS (Indian Administrative Service), something he himself had failed to achieve despite being a brilliant student. Manu is a very loving son and an intelligent student who shares a strong emotional bond with his father.

Ramesan starts to develop problems with his memory. What starts as commonplace omissions and absentmindedness, quickly grows into handicapping cognitive and behavioral impairments.

The first time we notice this is when Ramesan misplaces a very important office file at his home, inside the refrigerator. One day he arrives in office after buying a bag of vegetables and starts behaving as if he had reached home after his office hours. He begins acting strangely in the office, as if he has lost his sense of time and place. He is taken to the doctor by his family and close friend, Joseph (Jagathy Sreekumar).

In the hospital, Ramesan is diagnosed with Familial Alzheimer's disease, a disease which causes a gradual loss of memory and cognitive abilities. The news comes as a grave shock for the happy family and turns their world upside down. The family is devastated by the sad news, but tries to adjust to the situation with a lot of determination underscored by strong emotional bonds. How they cope up with the trauma, insecurity and uncertainty caused by Ramesan's plight, forms the gist of the movie.

Cast
Mohanlal as Ramesan Nair
Meera Vasudevan as  Lekha
Arjun Lal as Manu Ramesh
Baby Niranjana Vijayan as Manju Ramesh
Nedumudi Venu as Ramesan's father
Jagathy Sreekumar as Joseph
Innocent as Lekha's father
Manka Mahesh as Lekha's Mother
Prathap Pothan as Doctor
Seetha as Swarnam, Ramesan Nair's childhood friend
Lakshmipriya as Ramesan Nair's co-staff
Nandhini as Rameshan's Neighbour's Daughter

Soundtrack

The music of this movie is composed by Mohan Sithara and the lyrics by Bharathiyar (Kaatru Veliyidai) and Kaithapram. Song mixing was done by Renjith Viswanathan.

Box office
The film was commercial success at the boxoffice.

Awards
National Film Awards
 Best Feature Film in Malayalam (Producer) - Raju Mathew

Kerala State Film Awards
Best Film (Producer) - Raju Mathew
Best Director - Blessy
Best Actor - Mohanlal
Best Screen Play - Blessy
Special Mention Award - Arjun Lal

Filmfare Awards South
Best Actor - Mohanlal
Best Director - Blessy

Asianet Film Awards
Best Actor - Mohanlal
Best Director - Blessy
Best Supporting Actor -Nedumudi Venu
Best Male Playback Singer : M. G. Sreekumar
Best Female New Face of the Year - Meera Vasudevan
Best Male New Face of the Year - Arjun Lal
Special Jury Award - Jagathy Sreekumar
Best Child Artist  - Baby Niranjana

Vanitha Film Awards
Best Actor - Mohanlal
Best Director - Blessy

Kerala Film Critics Awards
Most Popular Actor - Mohanlal

Amrita Film Awards
Best Film (Producer) - Raju Mathew
Best Director - Blessy

Mathrubhumi Film Awards
 Best Actor - Mohanlal

Kerala Film Audience Council Awards
Best Actor - Mohanlal

J.C. Foundation Awards
Best Actor - Mohanlal
Best Director - Blessy
Best Child Artist  - Baby Niranjana

Kala Keralam Award
Best Actor - Mohanlal

National Film Academy Award
Best Actor - Mohanlal

References

External links
 

2005 films
2000s Malayalam-language films
Films directed by Blessy
Films scored by Mohan Sithara
Indian films about Alzheimer's disease
Indian drama films
Films about altered memories
Films shot in Thiruvananthapuram
Films shot in Palakkad
Best Malayalam Feature Film National Film Award winners